Tonis puri is a type of Georgian bread, baked in a specific oven called a tone or torne. The word is cognate with tandoor. The bread is served as any other bread, but it tends to be more popular on special celebrations such as Easter, Christmas, and New Year's Day, as well as birthdays and weddings.

See also
 Shotis puri
 Naan

References

Cuisine of Georgia (country)
Flatbreads